Nour Dissem (born 12 May 1990) is a Tunisian road and track cyclist. She won five national titles at the Tunisian National Road Championships between 2014 and 2016.

Major results

2011
 Pan Arab Games
1st  Team road race
2nd  Road race
2nd  Time trial
2013
 8th Road race, African Road Championships
2014
 National Road Championships
1st  Time trial
1st  Road race
2015
 National Road Championships
1st  Time trial
1st  Road race
 3rd  Omnium, African Track Championships
2016
 1st  Road race, National Road Championships

References

External links
 

Tunisian female cyclists
Living people
Place of birth missing (living people)
1990 births
20th-century Tunisian women
21st-century Tunisian women